Cornelis Coenraad Leenheer (June 5, 1906 in Weesp – January 20, 1979 in Zwolle) was a Dutch water polo player who competed in the 1928 Summer Olympics. He was part of the Dutch team in the 1928 tournament. He played both matches and scored four goals.

References

1906 births
1979 deaths
People from Weesp
Dutch male water polo players
Water polo players at the 1928 Summer Olympics
Olympic water polo players of the Netherlands
Sportspeople from North Holland
20th-century Dutch people